1.5 (one and one half, three halves, or sesquialterum) may refer to:

1.5 °C is the preferred limit of global warming signed in the Paris Agreement
1.5, an album by Big Data
Superparticular ratio: 3/2 or 1
Perfect fifth (3/2), a musical interval